Jhansi Municipal Corporation is the municipal corporation responsible for the civic infrastructure and administration of the city of Jhansi. It administers the city's services like public health and parks. The head of the corporation is the mayor. The current mayor is Ramteerath Singhal of the Bharatiya Janata Party while the commissioner is Manoj Kumar, IAS.

The corporation is responsible for public education, correctional institutions, libraries, public safety, recreational facilities, sanitation, water supply, local planning, and welfare services. The mayor and councilors are elected to five-year terms.

In August 2015, Jhansi was selected among 98 cities for smart city initiative by Government of India.

See also

 List of municipal corporations in India

References

External links
 

Jhansi
Municipal corporations in Uttar Pradesh
Year of establishment missing